Errand into the Wilderness is a 1956 intellectual history book about colonial America written by Perry Miller.

Publication 

The book's title is taken from a 1660 sermon by Samuel Danforth.

Notes

References 

 
 
 
 
 
 
 
 
 
 
 
 
 
 
 
 
 
 http://s-usih.org/2015/07/david-a-hollinger-on-reconsidering-perry-millers-errand-into-the-wilderness-1956.html

External links 

 

1956 non-fiction books
History books about the United States
Belknap Press books
English-language books